Geology of Mumbai refers to the geology of the city of the island city of Mumbai.

Back Bay and Bandra reclamation are the major reclamation areas of Mumbai in the Arabian sea.

Soil
The predominant soil cover in Mumbai city is sandy, whereas in the suburban district, the soil cover is alluvial and loamy.

References

Geography of Mumbai
Geology of Maharashtra